Sticklinge is a small community outside Stockholm, Sweden on the island of Lidingö. The population is about 5,000 people. The locality Sticklinge udde is located in northern Sticklinge.

Populated places in Lidingö Municipality